The Risk of Darkness is a novel by Susan Hill.  It is the third novel in the "Simon Serrailler" crime series.

References

Novels by Susan Hill
2006 British novels
British crime novels
Chatto & Windus books